Ryszard Jarzembowski (24 December 1945, in Poland – 9 August 2021) was a Polish politician who served as a Senator.

Jarzembowski died on 9 August 2021 in Włocławek, Poland, at the age of 75.

References

1945 births
2021 deaths
Polish politicians
Polish city councillors
Democratic Left Alliance politicians
Members of the Senate of Poland 1991–1993
Members of the Senate of Poland 1993–1997
Members of the Senate of Poland 1997–2001
Members of the Senate of Poland 2001–2005
University of Warsaw alumni
People from Pinneberg (district)